Lakovic or Lakovič (Serbian Cyrillic: Лаковић) is a gender-neutral Slavic surname that may refer to

Elvir Laković Laka (born 1969), Bosnian rock singer-songwriter
Jaka Lakovič (born 1978), Slovenian basketball player and coach
Predrag Laković (1929–1997), Serbian actor 
Sasha Lakovic (1971–2017), Canadian ice hockey player